The following are lists of actors:

Specific roles or genres

List of actors who have played the Doctor
List of actors who have played Mycroft Holmes
List of actors who have played Sherlock Holmes
List of actors who have played Inspector Lestrade
List of actors who have played Professor Moriarty
List of actors who have played Elvis Presley
List of actors who have played Dr. Watson
List of actors who played President of the United States
List of actors who played Santa Claus
List of Spaghetti Western actors
List of voice actors

Nationality

List of Albanian actors
List of Afghan actors
List of Armenian actors
List of Assyrian actors
List of Austrian film actors
List of Azerbaijani actors
List of Bangladeshi actors
List of Bangladeshi actresses
Lists of American actors
List of Brazilian actors
List of British actors
List of British pornographic actors
List of Bulgarian actors
List of Burmese actors
List of Canadian actors
List of Chilean actors
List of Chinese actors
List of Chinese actresses
List of Croatian actors
List of Czech actors
List of Czech actresses
List of Danish actors
List of Egyptian actors
List of Estonian actors
List of Filipino actresses
List of Filipino actors
List of French actors
List of German actors
List of Ghanaian actors
List of Greek actors
List of Hungarian actors
List of Indian film actresses
List of Indian film actors
List of Iranian actresses
List of Iranian actors
List of Israeli actors
List of Irish actors
List of Italian actresses
List of Italian actors
List of Italian-American actors
List of Japanese actors
List of Japanese actresses
List of Khmer film actors
List of Lithuanian actors
List of Malaysian actors
List of Mexican voice actors
List of Mexican actors
List of Mexican actresses
List of Native American actors
List of Nepalese actors
List of New Zealand actors
List of Nigerian actors
List of Norwegian actors
List of Pakistani actresses
List of Pakistani actors
List of Polish actors
List of Portuguese film actors
List of Romanian actors
List of Scottish actors
List of South African actors
List of South Korean actresses
List of South Korean actors
List of Spanish actors
List of Swedish actors
List of Taiwanese actresses
List of Thai actresses
List of Thai actors
List of Vietnamese actors

Other

 Lists of actors by television series
 List of actors with Academy Award nominations
 List of actors with Hollywood Walk of Fame motion picture stars
 List of actor-politicians
 Lists of actresses
 List of actors in gay pornographic films
 List of Bond girls
 List of Lollywood actors
 List of pornographic actors who appeared in mainstream films
 List of mainstream actors who have appeared in pornographic films
 List of pornographic performers by decade
 List of stars on the Hollywood Walk of Fame
 List of actors who have played multiple roles in the same film
 WAMPAS Baby Stars

See also

List of documentary films
List of film and television directors
List of film production companies
Lists of films
Lists of people by occupation